Abdourahman Osman (born 7 December 1993 in Tadjoura, Djibouti) is a Djiboutian swimmer specializing in freestyle. He competed in the 50 m event at the 2012 Summer Olympics.

References

External links
 

1993 births
Living people
Djiboutian male freestyle swimmers
Swimmers at the 2012 Summer Olympics
Olympic swimmers of Djibouti
Swimmers at the 2010 Summer Youth Olympics